Thomas Dew (died ) was a Virginia landowner and politician.

Dew settled in the vicinity of the Nansemond River by 1634, and in 1642 represented what was then-called "Upper Norfolk County" (but a decade later became Nansemond County) in the General Assembly.  Nansemond County voters then re-elected Dew to what became called the House of Burgesses in every session until 1656, and in the second (November) session of 1652 he succeeded his neighbor Edward Major as Speaker; with burgesses electing Walter Chiles of Charles City County their speaker in the next session. Dew served on the Governor's Council of State from 1655 until 1660.

In 1656 Virginia's governor authorized Dew to explore the coast of North Carolina between Cape Hatteras and Cape Fear. Later in his life, he became a Quaker. However, his descendant Dr. William Dew would employ many slaves on his Providence Plantation and Farm in King and Queen County, Virginia and his namesake descendant Thomas R. Dew, who became President of the College of William and Mary, would become known for his pro-slavery advocacy.

References

1690s deaths
Speakers of the Virginia House of Burgesses
Politicians from Suffolk, Virginia
Year of birth unknown